SON-30 (NATO reporting name Fire Wheel) is a type of Russian/Soviet fire director radar for 130 mm anti-aircraft guns. It was a Soviet derivative of the US SCR-584 system.

See also
SON-9
SON-50

External links
Anti-Aircraft Artillery

References

Ground radars
Russian and Soviet military radars